Nathaniel Bayly  (c.1726–1798) was an English owner of West Indies plantations and a politician who sat in the House of Commons from 1770 to 1779.

Early life
In 1726, Nathaniel Bayly was born in Westbury, Wiltshire.

In the 1730s, Nathaniel Bayly was a young boy when his family relocated with him to the Colony of Jamaica. In 1759, Nathaniel Bayly moved to England, and he conducted a trans-Atlantic family business with his brother Zachary Bayly, using their slaves on their Jamaican estates to create large profits, and using their political contacts to protect their investments.

Slave owner
The Bayly family owned several plantations and thousands of slaves in the Colony of Jamaica.

After being with his family in Jamaica, he returned to England in 1759, and lived in style in London.

In 1770, Nathaniel Bayly inherited the Jamaican property of his brother Zachary, which included plantations and thousands of slaves at Baylys Vale, Brimmer Hall, Crawle, Nonsuch, Trinity plantation, Tryall and Unity and stores and other buildings in Saint Mary Parish, Jamaica, including the town of Port Maria, and at Greenwich Park in Saint Andrew Parish, Jamaica.

Family
He married Elizabeth Ingram, daughter of Hon. Charles Ingram MP on 3 May 1767. Bayly married secondly Sophia Magdalena Lamack of Clapham on 18 March 1773.

Political career
Bayly was invited to stand for Abingdon  in the  1768 general election, probably because he could afford the expense. He was defeated in the poll but was seated as Member of Parliament on petition on 8 February 1770. In the  1774 general election he stood for Abingdon, but fearing defeat was also named for Westbury on Lord Abingdon's interest.  The election at Abingdon was declared void because the winning candidate, John Mayor, was High Sheriff at the time, and  Bayly decided to sit for Westbury  where he had been unopposed. Over the next few years, Bayly made frequent speeches in Parliament, almost entirely with regard to West Indies affairs. He feared mainly that  the American policy would be disastrous for the Islands, but also criticized the rum contract, complained that the islands were inadequately defended and attacked an extra tax on sugar. In March 1779 he resigned his seat because he had important matters to deal with in the West Indies and could not do justice to his parliamentary duties. He had returned to England by 1783 and made several attempts to find a seat in Parliament but was unsuccessful.

Later life and legacy
From 1790 to 1796, Bayly was Commissioner of Forts and Fortifications, for the North side of Jamaica. He died in Jamaica in October 1798. In his will he refers to his sugar plantations at Bremer Hall, Roslin, Trinity and Tryall and estates at Gibraltar and Wentworth on the island of Jamaica, and the "large quantities of negroes, stock and cattle" on them.

References

1700s births
1798 deaths
British MPs 1768–1774
British MPs 1774–1780
Members of the Parliament of Great Britain for English constituencies
Planters from the British West Indies